Franz Schwaiger (1 February 1918 – 24 April 1944) was a Luftwaffe ace and recipient of the Knight's Cross of the Iron Cross during World War II.  The Knight's Cross of the Iron Cross was awarded to recognise extreme battlefield bravery or successful military leadership - for the fighter pilots, it was a quantifiable measure of skill and success.

Military career

Franz completed his pilot training in the summer of 1941, just as the German invasion of Russia (Operation Barbarossa) opened. He was posted, as an Unteroffizier, with 6./JG 3, a part of II./JG 3 under the command of Gordon Gollob and fighting with Army Group South. Schwaiger quickly earned his first air victory, on 16.08.1941, but by the end of the year had reached a total of eight victories at which time his unit was rotated back to the Reich for rest and re-equipping.

A short secondment for his Gruppe to the Mediterranean Theatre, from January to April 1942, yielded no further success for Franz, but upon their return to the Eastern Front in May he started scoring steadily. Again covering Army Group South and the advance across the Ukraine toward Stalingrad, he scored his 20th victory on 31 July. The next week he was transferred to 2./JG 3, in the same sector. He scored his 30th victory on 17 August, and his 40th on 29 September, between which he had been transferred again, this time to 3./JG 3. Promoted to Feldwebel in early October, he scored his 50th victory on the 9th before being awarded the Knight's Cross, for 53 victories, on 29 October.

At the start of 1943 as the disaster at Stalingrad unfolded, and with 56 victories, Franz was sent for officer-training. Commissioned as a Leutnant, he returned to I./JG 3 as their highest-scoring pilot. In the intervening months the Gruppe had been recalled to Germany for Defence of the Reich duties against the increasingly intensive bombing raids of the 8th United States Army Air Forces (USAAF). This was a completely different type of aerial warfare - at high altitude and against the slow but very heavily armed box-formations of American bombers. Based around the industrial Ruhr heartland and Holland for the next year, he slowly added to his score.

He was made Staffelkapitän of 1./JG 3 on 9 March 1944. However, only 6 weeks later on April 24, while fighting a formation of American bombers and their fighter escort, Schwaiger shot down his 67th victory - a P-51 Mustang - but his Bf 109G had problems with its fuel supply, forcing him to break off and return to base. On the way back, and flying alone, his plane was intercepted by U.S. fighters near Augsburg. Forced to crash-land, he was killed by American pilots strafing him as he attempted to escape from his aircraft	.

At the time of his death, Leutnant Franz Schwaiger had 67 victories comprising 56 on the Russian front (including 13 Il-2 Sturmovik bombers) and 11 on the Western Front (including four four-engined bombers).

Summary of career

Aerial victory claims
According to US historian David T. Zabecki, Schwaiger was credited with 67 aerial victories.

Awards
 Flugzeugführerabzeichen
 Front Flying Clasp of the Luftwaffe
 Iron Cross (1939)
 2nd Class
 1st Class
 German Cross in Gold on 29 October 1942 as Unteroffizier in the 3./Jagdgeschwader 3
 Knight's Cross of the Iron Cross on 23 October 1942 as Unteroffizier and pilot in the 6./Jagdgeschwader 3 "Udet"

Notes

References

Citations

Bibliography

 
 
 
 Barbas, Bernd (1985). 	Planes of the Luftwaffe Fighter Aces Vol I 	Kookaburra Technical Publishing. 	 incl a colour profile of his aircraft [p62]
 Musciano, Walter (1989). 	Messerschmitt Aces		Tab Books 	
 Spick, Mike (2006). 	Aces of the Reich  	Greenhill Books. 	
 
 Weal, John (2007). 	More Bf109 Aces of the Russian Front  	Oxford: Osprey Publishing Ltd. 	. 
 Weal, John (1999). 	Bf109F/G/K Aces of the Western Front  Oxford: Osprey Publishing Ltd.	.
 Weal, John (2006). 	Bf109 Defence of the Reich Aces  	Oxford: Osprey Publishing Ltd.	.

External links
Ritterkreuztraeger 1939-1945
Luftwaffe 1939-1945
 Retrieved 7 January 2013

1918 births
1944 deaths
Military personnel from Ulm
People from the Kingdom of Württemberg
Luftwaffe pilots
German World War II flying aces
Recipients of the Gold German Cross
Recipients of the Knight's Cross of the Iron Cross
Luftwaffe personnel killed in World War II
Aviators killed by being shot down